While modern standing armies were first developed in the 15th century, the defining terminology for contemporary military units and formations, such as company, battalion, regiment etc. mostly arose in the early modern period, during the 16th and 17th centuries.

Only units that are still extant are included, while contemporary refoundings of older units are excluded.

Oldest active military units still in operation

See also
 List of armies
 List of oldest institutions in continuous operation
 Army National Guard and Active Regular Army Units with Colonial Roots (US Army only)

References